Roxana (4th century BC) was a Bactrian noble and a wife of Alexander the Great. The name has a variety of spellings in different languages, including Roxana or Roxanna or Rukhsana or Ruqsana.

Roxana or Roxanna or Rukhsana or Ruqsana may also refer to:

Places in the United States
 Roxana, Alabama
 Roxana, Delaware
 Roxana, Georgia
 Roxana, Illinois
 Roxana (East Chicago), Illinois
 Roxana, Kentucky

Other
 Olethreutes or Roxana, a tortrix moth genus
 Roxana: The Fortunate Mistress, a 1724 novel by Daniel Defoe
 Roxana, the Beauty of Montenegro, an 1878 ballet by Marius Petipa
 Rukhsana, a 1955 Indian Hindi language film

People with the given name

Roxana/Roxanna
Roxana Bârcă
Roxana Boamfă
Roxana Briban
Roxana Cocoș
Roxana Cogianu
Roxana Condurache
Roxana Dumitrescu
Roxana Han
Roxana Luca
Roxana Mărăcineanu
Roxana Popa
Roxana Saberi
Roxana Zal

Ruksana/Rukhsana/Rukhshana
Rukhsana Ahmad
Rukhsana Bangash
Rukhsana Jamshed Buttar
Rukhsana Kausar
Rukhsana Khan
Rukhsana Kokab
Rukhsana Noor
Ruksana Osman
Rukhsar Rehman
Rukhsana Sultana

Ruqsana
Ruqsana Begum

See also
 Roxane (disambiguation)
 Roxanna (disambiguation)
 Roxanne (disambiguation)
 Roshanak, a female given name
 Oksana, a female given name

Romanian feminine given names
Pakistani feminine given names